Eismeer railway station (German for Ice Sea) is an underground railway station bored into the mountain Eiger on the Jungfrau Railway, which runs to the Jungfraujoch from Kleine Scheidegg. It lies at an altitude of 3,159 metres above sea level, which makes it the second highest railway station in Europe. Located just behind the south-east face of the Eiger, the station's principal purpose is to allow passengers to observe the view of the glacier Ischmeer (lit.: Ice Sea, formerly called Grindelwald-Fiescher Glacier). To that end, uphill trains stop at the station for five minutes.

The station opened on 25 July 1905, with the extension of the Jungfraubahn from its previous terminus at Eigerwand station. The building of the line this far had depleted the railway company's finances, and for the next seven years, Eismeer was to remain the upper terminus. After further fund-raising and an extended construction period, the line was extended to Jungfraujoch station in 1912 and Eismeer became an intermediate stop.

Administratively, the station is in the municipality of Grindelwald in the canton of Bern.

The following passenger trains operate:

See also 
 List of highest railway stations in Switzerland
 List of buildings and structures above 3000 m in Switzerland

References

External links 
 
 

Railway stations in Switzerland opened in 1905
Railway stations in the canton of Bern
Eiger